The Imperial German Navy  Zeppelin LZ 64, given the tactical number L 22, was a Q-class / L20-class World War I zeppelin of the Imperial German Navy.

Operational history
LZ 64 carried out thirty reconnaissance missions, including 8 attacks on Britain, dropping  of bombs.

Last mission
Lieutenant Robert Leckie (a Canadian) of the Royal Naval Air Service (RNAS), was sent on a mission on 14 May 1917, as pilot of Curtiss Model H-12 Large America 8666, under the command of Flight Lieutenant Christopher John Galpin. The aircraft left Great Yarmouth on patrol at 03.30 a.m. in poor weather, with heavy rain and low cloud. The Curtiss increased speed and gained height, with Leckie at the controls as Galpin manned the twin Lewis guns mounted in the bow. 

The Curtiss managed to approach to within  before she was spotted, and the Zeppelin attempted to evade, but by then it was too late. Zeppelin L 64 rapidly caught fire, and crashed into the sea. The Curtiss returned to Great Yarmouth by 7:50 a.m., and they found only two bullet holes, in the left upper wing and the hull amidships, where the Germans had returned fire. Leckie was also credited in the downing of LZ 112.

Specifications (LZ 64)

See also

List of Zeppelins
LZ-22 forced to land on 21 August 1914

References

 
 

Airships of Germany
Hydrogen airships
Zeppelins
Aviation accidents and incidents in 1917
Accidents and incidents involving balloons and airships